"April in Portugal" is a popular song, also named "The Whisp'ring Serenade." The music was written by Raul Ferrão with Portuguese lyrics by José Galhardo as a fado named "Coimbra", about the city of that name in 1947. English lyrics written by Jimmy Kennedy were set to the music, though many of the most popular versions of the song were instrumentals. It is one of the signature songs of Portuguese singer and fadista Amália Rodrigues. It was also recorded in French by the tenor Luís Piçarra.

Charting versions

Charting versions were recorded by the Les Baxter orchestra, by the Richard Hayman orchestra, by the Freddy Martin orchestra, and by Vic Damone:

The Les Baxter recording was released by Capitol Records as catalog number 2374. It first reached the Billboard magazine charts on March 28, 1953, and lasted 22 weeks on the chart, peaking at #2.

The Richard Hayman recording was released by Mercury Records as catalog number 70114. It first reached the Billboard magazine charts on April 25, 1953, and lasted 11 weeks on the chart, peaking at #12.
The Freddy Martin recording was released by RCA Victor as catalog number 20-5052. It first reached the Billboard magazine charts on May 9, 1953, and lasted 3 weeks on the chart, peaking at #15.
The Vic Damone recording was released by Mercury Records as catalog number 70128. It first reached the Billboard magazine charts on May 30, 1953, and lasted 3 weeks on the chart, peaking at #16.

On Cash Box magazine's chart, where all versions were combined, the song reached a peak position of #2.

Other contemporary versions

Other versions recorded include those by:
Tony Martin with Lennie Hayton's orchestra and chorus, recorded on March 26, 1953, released by RCA Victor as catalog number 20-5279 (in USA) and by EMI on the His Master's Voice label as catalog number B 10500. 
Geraldo & his new Concert Orchestra, recorded on April 30, 1953, released by Philips Records as catalog number PB-149 
Louis Armstrong, recorded on April 21, 1953, released by Decca Records as catalog number 28704 
Eartha Kitt with Henri René's Orchestra, recorded on March 13, 1953, released by RCA Victor in an Extended Play album, catalog number EPB 3062
Mantovani and his Orchestra, recorded on October 14, 1959, on the album Continental Encores for Decca, SKL 4044.
Bing Crosby with Malcolm Lockyer & His Orchestra, recorded on May 8, 1961, for the "Holiday in Europe" album - produced by Project Records and leased to US Decca.
Don Costa, released in 1961 on the album The Sound Of The Million Sellers, United Artists WWS 8513.
Mickey Katz recorded a Yiddish-inflected parody called "Paisach in Portugal" in 1954.

Other recorded versions

The song has also been recorded by:

Luís Piçarra (in French)   
Earl Bostic  - (King Records)   
The Dukes of Dixieland  - (Okeh Records)   
Eartha Kitt  - (Kapp Records)   
Enoch Light And His Orchestra  - (Project 3 Records)   
Buddy Merrill  - (Accent Records)  
Pérez Prado - (RCA Victor) 
The Melachrino Strings  - (RCA Victor) 
Jane Morgan -  (Epic Records)  
Mitchell Ayres And His Orchestra  - (RCA Victor)   
Lawrence Welk  - (Ranwood Records)   
Roger Williams  - (Kapp Records)   
Florian Zabach  - (Decca Records)
Chet Atkins - (RCA Victor)
Bert Kaempfert - (Decca Records)
Eddy Christiani - (Netherlands-Europe)
Esquivel  - (RCA Victor)
Juanjo Dominguez  - (Epsa Music)
Norman Luboff - (RCA Victor)
Gabriella Ferri - (Canti di Versi, Rossodisera, 2000)

References

Songs about Portugal
1947 songs
Vic Damone songs
Songs with lyrics by Jimmy Kennedy
Okeh Records singles